Virginia wine refers to wine made primarily from grapes grown in the commonwealth of Virginia. Wine has been produced in the area since the early days of European colonization in the 17th century. Virginia has hot humid summers that can be challenging to viticulture, and only within the last twenty years has the industry developed beyond novelty status. By tonnage, Vitis vinifera varieties represents 75% of total production. French hybrids varieties account for nearly 20% of total wine grape production in the commonwealth, while American varietals make up only about 5% of the total. As of 2012, the top 5 varietals produced are Chardonnay, Cabernet Franc, Merlot, Vidal blanc and Viognier.

As of 2016, the commonwealth has approximately  under cultivation, with a total harvest of over 6500 tons. The commonwealth ranks fifth in the nation for both bearing acreage and grape production. The central and northern Virginia counties, in particular those located just east of the Blue Ridge Mountains, account for the significant majority of the commonwealth's production.

History
Virginia has a history of wine that dates back to the colonial era. In 1619, at the meeting of the first representative assembly in English America, the burgesses sitting in the Jamestown church passed “Acte 12” which required Virginia colonists to plant vineyards.

Around 1807, Thomas Jefferson, considered one of the greatest patrons of wine in the United States, had established two vineyards in his south orchard. His goal to make wine from his Virginia Monticello estate was met with the unsuccessful cultivation of the classic European grape varieties due to the inability to control black rot and the destructive aphid-like root louse called phylloxera.

In the early 1900s, Charlottesville's Monticello Wine Company and its Virginia Claret Wine were so well-regarded that the city declared itself to be "the Capital of the Wine Belt in Virginia."

The rebirth was led in part by the investment of the Zonin family of Italy in a new vineyard in Barboursville in 1976. Barboursville Vineyards served as a catalyst in the 1970s, alongside the now defunct Oakencroft Vineyards. Throughout the 1980s and 1990s, many other vineyards and wineries joined the mix and by 2009, over 163 wineries were operating in Virginia. By 2012 there were over 230 wineries operating in Virginia. Almost all of these are small, family-owned vineyards and wineries, and only the very largest have developed distribution networks. As a result, the wineries rely on wine tourism and direct sales for most of their revenue. To encourage visitors, they often play host to special events with music, food, and other activities.
As Virginia wines sold in Virginia have the requirement that the majority of the grapes used must be grown in Virginia, and since Virginia is not growing enough grapes to support the number of wineries, one Floyd County winery has expanded its operation in a five-year contract to export its wines to China.  Chateau Morrisette, with the help of Governor Bob McDonnell's office, will be exporting its Merlot to China, and plans to add other wines later.

Wine industry
A growing number of for-profit and non-profit organizations have been established since the 1980s to help promote Virginia Wine. Two of the more well known organizations are the Virginia Vineyards Association (VVA) and the Virginia Wineries Association (VWA). The state of Virginia has taken an active role in helping promote the wine industry in the state even to the extent of managing a state wide distributor company for Virginia wineries called Virginia Winery Distribution Company (VWDC) that was established by the Virginia Department of Agriculture and Consumer Services. The intent of the VWDC is to provide wholesale wine distribution services for Virginia farm wineries, many of which are too small to manage on their own.

Grape varieties from Virginia Wine Region
There are a lot of grape varieties that you will come across in the Virginia wine region. By capacity, Vitis vinifera varieties represent 75% of total production. French hybrid varieties account for nearly 20% of total wine grape production, while American varietals make up only about 5%.

The top 5 grape varietals produced are Chardonnay, Cabernet Franc, Merlot, Vidal Blanc, and Viognier. The most planted grape variety is Chardonnay, though Cabernet Franc and Viognier are also well illustrated throughout the region. However, though often overlooked, Petit Manseng and Petit Verdot are used to create wines that uniquely showcase Virginia’s terroir.

America’s oldest grape variety was born in Virginia. Some winemakers are still working to revive Norton to its prominence as America’s native grape. This grape became available in 1830 and very shortly after that came to conquer wine production in the eastern and midwestern states like Ohio and Virginia.

In 2016, 2,600 acres were under cultivation, with a total harvest of over 6500 tons. The central and northern Virginia regions account for the substantial majority of the production.

The number of vineyards and wineries in Virginia grow each year. As of 2019 there are over 250 registered vineyards and wineries in the state.

References

External links 

Virginia Wine Marketing Office
 Virginia Wineries, Official Tourism Website of the Commonwealth of Virginia
Virginia Vineyard Association: News

 
Wine regions of the United States by state
American wine